Rubus species (brambles, blackberry-like plants) are used as food plants by the larvae of a number of Lepidoptera.

Monophagous
Species which feed exclusively on Rubus:

 Coleophoridae
 Coleophora thulea – only known from cloudberry (R. chamaemorus)
 Drepanidae
 Thyatira batis (peach blossom)

Polyphagous
Species which feed on Rubus among other plants:

 Arctiidae
 Arctia caja (garden tiger moth)
 Spilosoma luteum (buff ermine) – recorded on raspberry (R. idaeus)
 Coleophoridae
 Coleophora plumbella – recorded on cloudberry (R. chamaemorus)
 Coleophora potentillae
 Drepanidae
 Habrosyne pyritoides (buff arches) – recorded on blackberry (R. fruticosus)
 Gelechiidae
 Chionodes viduella – recorded on cloudberry (R. chamaemorus)
 Geometridae
 Alcis repandata (mottled beauty) – recorded on blackberry (R. fruticosus)
 Chloroclysta truncata (common marbled carpet)
 Chloroclystis v-ata (the v-pug)
 Crocallis elinguaria (scalloped oak) – recorded on raspberry (R. idaeus)
 Ectropis crepuscularia (the engrailed) – recorded on raspberry (R. idaeus)
 Eupithecia pusillata (juniper pug) – recorded on raspberry (R. idaeus)
 Eupithecia subfuscata (grey pug) – recorded on raspberry (R. idaeus)
 Gymnoscelis rufifasciata (double-striped pug) – recorded on raspberry (R. idaeus)
 Hemithea aestivaria (common emerald)
 Idaea biselata (small fan-footed wave)
 Operophtera brumata (winter moth) – recorded on raspberry (R. idaeus)
 Hepialidae
 Korscheltellus lupulina (common swift)
 Hesperiidae
 Pyrgus alveus (large grizzled skipper)
 Pyrgus malvae (grizzled skipper) – recorded on blackberry (R. fruticosus)
 Lymantriidae
 Euproctis chrysorrhoea (brown-tail)
 Noctuidae
 Acronicta psi (grey dagger)
 Agrotis exclamationis (heart and dart)
 Amphipyra tragopoginis (mouse moth) – recorded on cloudberry (R. chamaemorus)
 Cosmia trapezina (the dun-bar)
 Diarsia mendica (ingrailed clay) – recorded on blackberry (R. fruticosus)
 Diarsia rubi (small square-spot) – recorded on raspberry (R. idaeus)
 Euplexia lucipara (small angle shades) – recorded on raspberry (R. idaeus)
 Eupsilia transversa (the satellite)
 Melanchra persicariae (dot moth) – recorded on raspberry (R. idaeus)
 Noctua janthina (lesser broad-bordered yellow underwing)
 Orthosia gothica (Hebrew character) – recorded on raspberry (R. idaeus)
 Phlogophora meticulosa (angle shades) – recorded on blackberry (R. fruticosus)
 Xestia triangulum (double square-spot) – recorded on blackberry (R. fruticosus)
 Oecophoridae
 Alabonia geoffrella – recorded in dead twigs of blackberries (Rubus subgenus Rubus section Rubus)
 Saturniidae
 Pavonia pavonia (emperor moth)
 Tortricidae
 Syndemis musculana

External links
 

Rubus
+Lepidoptera